Lake Ratva is a lake in Estonia.

See also
List of lakes of Estonia

Ratva
Alutaguse Parish
Ratva